Dead Awake is a 2010 American mystery film starring Nick Stahl, Rose McGowan, and Amy Smart. The film was previously titled Dylan's Wake.

Plot
Dylan (Stahl) tries to unravel the answer to a decade-long mystery by staging his own funeral and examining who shows up. The problem is, Dylan might actually be dead.

Cast
 Nick Stahl as Dylan
 Rose McGowan as Charlie
 Amy Smart as Natalie
 Ben Marten as Steve
 Shane Simmons as David

Production
Filming took place in the Fall of 2009, in Des Moines, Iowa, and was released in December 2010 to mixed reviews. Mark Olsen of the Los Angeles Times said in his review; "Though the performers gamely try to make the most of what little they have to work with, the film is murky to look at and unfocused in its storytelling. "Dead Awake" is a deadly snore." Positive marks came from the NYC Movie Guru, who called the film "an intriguing blend of mystery, suspense, drama and supernatural thrills that slightly loses steam as its trust in the audience's intelligence wanes."

References

External links
 
 

2010 films
2010 horror films
2010 psychological thriller films
2010s English-language films
American psychological horror films
American horror thriller films
American mystery horror films
Films shot in Iowa
2010s American films